Orléans – Saint-Denis-de-l'Hôtel Airport  is a French airport located in the Saint-Denis-de-l'Hôtel commune in the Loiret département, Centre-Val de Loire region, France

Geography
The airport is on the northern part of the commune of Saint-Denis-de-l'Hôtel, in the Loire Valley, north of the Loire river and south of the Orléans forest. The access by the Tangentielle d'Orléans (Route nationale 60) is via exit #13 (ST Denis de L'H ; Jargeau; Fay aux Loges ; AERODROME), towards route départementale 921.

Nearest SNCF railway stations: Orléans and Les Aubrais-Orléans.

Facilities
The paved runway has lighting (HI - PAPI - feux à éclats EN 23).

Activities
The airport essentially serves business aircraft and freight, though tourist aviation also contributes a significant part of the traffic. Associations practising skydiving, model aircraft and gliding are also on site. An OPALE weather station is also there.
A new Helicopter Airline company is now available on the airfield. Helisphere.
Also a Luxury Inflight Catering Company, Oz Operations, is now based on LFOZ airport.

Statistics

See also 

 List of airports in France

References

External links 
  Aéroport du Loiret - Orléans-Saint-Denis-de-l'Hôtel
  Aéroport d'Orléans - Saint-Denis-de-l'Hôtel (LFOZ) at Union des Aéroports Français
  Aéro-club d'Orléans
 

Airports in Centre-Val de Loire
Buildings and structures in Loiret
Transport in Centre-Val de Loire